Qeshlaq-e Seyyedlar-e Seyfollah (also Romanized as Qeshlāq-e Seyyedlar-e Seyfollāh) is a village in Qeshlaq-e Jonubi Rural District, Qeshlaq Dasht District, Bileh Savar County, Ardabil Province, Iran. At the 2006 census, its population was 17, in 5 families.

References 

Populated places in Bileh Savar County
Towns and villages in Bileh Savar County